Petter August Leskinen (20 February 1876, in Karttula – 7 August 1952) was a Finnish logger, construction worker and politician. He was a member of the Parliament of Finland from 1919 to 1922, representing the Social Democratic Party of Finland (SDP).

References

1876 births
1952 deaths
People from Karttula
People from Kuopio Province (Grand Duchy of Finland)
Social Democratic Party of Finland politicians
Members of the Parliament of Finland (1919–22)
Loggers